George E. King may refer to:

 George Edwin King (1839–1901), second premier of New Brunswick, Canada
 George Edward King (1851–1934), Atlanta, Georgia hardware mogul

See also 
 George King (disambiguation)